There are three hamlets called Blackpool in Devon, England. These are in Brixton, near Plymouth, in Ilsington near Newton Abbot, and at Blackpool Sands on Start Bay respectively.

References

Hamlets in Devon